Catholic High School may refer to:

Asia 
Catholic High School, Singapore
Catholic High School, Melaka, Malaysia
Catholic High School, Petaling Jaya, Selangor, Malaysia
Catholic High School Sibu, Malaysia

Australia 
Catholic High School, Griffith, New South Wales

United States 
Pope John Paul II Catholic High School (Huntsville, Alabama)
Catholic High School for Boys (Little Rock, Arkansas)
Catholic High School (Baton Rouge, Louisiana)
Catholic High School (New Iberia, Louisiana)
Catholic High School (Kingston, New York)
Catholic High School (New Ulm, Minnesota)
Catholic High School (Virginia), Virginia Beach, Virginia; formerly Bishop Sullivan Catholic High School
Allentown Central Catholic High School, Allentown, Pennsylvania
Roman Catholic High School, Philadelphia, Pennsylvania

See also
Catholic school